Matilda Boson (born 4 December 1981, Linköping) is a Swedish handball player who plays for the Sweden women's national handball team. She participated at the 2008 Summer Olympics in Beijing, where Sweden placed 8th.  She was also part of the Swedish team at the 2012 Summer Olympics.

References

External links

1981 births
Living people
Sportspeople from Linköping
Swedish female handball players
Olympic handball players of Sweden
Handball players at the 2008 Summer Olympics
Handball players at the 2012 Summer Olympics
21st-century Swedish women